
List of African American historic places in Florida

This list of African American Historic Places in Florida is based on a book by the National Park Service, The Preservation Press, the National Trust for Historic Preservation, and the National Conference of State Historic Preservation Officers.

Some of these sites are on the National Register of Historic Places (NR) as independent sites or as part of larger historic district. Several of the sites are National Historic Landmarks (NRL). Others have Florida historical markers (HM). The citation on historical markers is given in the reference. The location listed is the nearest community to the site. More precise locations are given in the reference.

Alachua County

 Gainesville
 Liberty Hill Schoolhouse
 Pleasant Street Historic District

Baker County
 Olustee
 Olustee Battlefield

Broward County
 Fort Lauderdale
 Old Dillard High School
 Woodlawn Cemetery (Fort Lauderdale)

Clay County
 Orange Park
 Joseph Green House
 Orange Park Negro Elementary School

Duval County

 Jacksonville
 Bethel Baptist Institutional Church,
 Brewster Hospital,
 Catherine Street Fire Station,
 Centennial Hall-Edward Waters College,
 Edwin M. Stanton School,
 Kingsley Plantation,
 Masonic Temple,
 Mount Zion AME Church,

Escambia County

 Pensacola
 James House
 St. Michael's Creole Benevolent Association Hall

Franklin County
 Sumatra
 Negro Fort

Hillsborough County, Florida
 Tampa
 Meacham Elementary School
 St. Peter Claver Catholic School

Lee County
 Fort Myers
 Paul Laurence Dunbar School
 Sanibel
 Sanibel Colored School

Leon County

 Tallahassee
 Carnegie Library at FAMU
 Foote-Hilyer Administration Building (former Florida A&M Hospital)
 John Gilmore Riley House
 Old Lincoln High School
 Union Bank

Manatee County
Bradenton
 Family Heritage House Museum  State College of Florida, Manatee-Sarasota

Marion County
 Ocala
 Fessenden Academy
 Mount Zion A.M.E. Church

Miami-Dade County

Miami
 D. A. Dorsey House
 Greater Bethel AME Church
 Lyric Theater
 St. John's Baptist Church

Monroe County
Marathon
 George Adderley House,
Pigeon Key
 Pigeon Key Historic District

Orange County
Eatonville
 Eatonville Historic District
Orlando
 Well'sbuilt Hotel

Palm Beach County

 Lake Worth
 Osborne School
 West Palm Beach
 Mickens House

Putnam County
Palatka
Newtown
Central Academy

St. Johns County

St. Augustine
 Fort Mose
 Lincolnville Historic District

Santa Rosa County
 Milton
 Mt. Pilgrim African Baptist Church
 Zion AME Church, African Methodist Episcopal Church

Seminole County
 Sanford
 St. James AME Church

St. Lucie County

 Fort Pierce
 Zora Neale Hurston House

Volusia County

 DeLeon Springs
 DeLeon Springs Colored School
Daytona Beach
 Howard Thurman House
 Mary McLeod Bethune Home
 Old DeLand Memorial Hospital
 White Hall
 Orange City
 Orange City Colored School

References

Further reading
  ( 2004–2007)

Florida geography-related lists
African-American history of Florida
Florida
Historic sites in Florida